Colin Hamilton may refer to:

 Colin Hamilton (curler), Scottish curler
 Colin Hamilton (footballer) (born 1992), Scottish footballer
 Colin Hamilton (pentathlete) (born 1966), Australian modern pentathlete